Club Deportivo Cañaña is a Peruvian football club, playing in the city of Lambayeque, Peru.

The club play in the Copa Perú which is the third division of the Peruvian league.

History
The club was 1986 Copa Perú champion, when defeated 7 de Agosto, Chanchamayo FC, Felix Donayre, Deportivo Tintaya, and Deportivo Camaná in the Final Group.

The club have played at the highest level of Peruvian football on five occasions, from 1987 Torneo Descentralizado until 1991 Torneo Descentralizado when was relegated to the Copa Perú.

Honours

National
Copa Perú: 1
Winners (1): 1986
Runner-up (1): 1983

See also
List of football clubs in Peru
Peruvian football league system

Football clubs in Peru